St. Anthony's Hospital is a private 393-bed hospital in St. Petersburg, Florida. It was founded by the Franciscan Sisters of Allegany in 1931 and is part of BayCare Health System.

History
The hospital opened in 1920 as Faith Hospital. The hospital faced financial troubles due to the Great Depression and closed in 1930. In June 1931, the Franciscan Sisters of Allegany bought Faith Hospital for $40,000. They renamed the hospital after the Franciscan saint, St. Anthony of Padua, because of his selfless dedication to God.

References

External links 
 

Hospitals in Florida
Buildings and structures in St. Petersburg, Florida
Hospital buildings completed in 1920
1920 establishments in Florida
Hospitals established in 1920